The 1978–79 NBA season was the Lakers' 31st season in the NBA and 19th season in Los Angeles. It was the final season for the team under the ownership of Jack Kent Cooke, who sold the team to Jerry Buss the following summer.

Offseason

Draft picks

Roster

Magic Johnson

Regular season

Season standings

z - clinched division title
y - clinched division title
x - clinched playoff spot

Record vs. opponents

Playoffs

|- align="center" bgcolor="#ffcccc"
| 1
| April 10
| @ Denver
| L 105–110
| Kareem Abdul-Jabbar (23)
| Kareem Abdul-Jabbar (12)
| Norm Nixon (11)
| McNichols Sports Arena16,011
| 0–1
|- align="center" bgcolor="#ccffcc"
| 2
| April 13
| Denver
| W 121–109
| Kareem Abdul-Jabbar (32)
| Jamaal Wilkes (13)
| Norm Nixon (16)
| The Forum14,182
| 1–1
|- align="center" bgcolor="#ccffcc"
| 3
| April 16
| @ Denver
| W 112–111
| Kareem Abdul-Jabbar (29)
| Kareem Abdul-Jabbar (16)
| Norm Nixon (12)
| McNichols Sports Arena16,181
| 2–1
|-

|- align="center" bgcolor="#ffcccc"
| 1
| April 17
| @ Seattle
| L 101–112
| Kareem Abdul-Jabbar (25)
| Kareem Abdul-Jabbar (11)
| Norm Nixon (7)
| Kingdome26,377
| 0–1
|- align="center" bgcolor="#ffcccc"
| 2
| April 18
| @ Seattle
| L 103–108 (OT)
| Kareem Abdul-Jabbar (31)
| Kareem Abdul-Jabbar (15)
| Norm Nixon (10)
| Kingdome26,862
| 0–2
|- align="center" bgcolor="#ccffcc"
| 3
| April 20
| Seattle
| W 118–112 (OT)
| Kareem Abdul-Jabbar (32)
| Jamaal Wilkes (9)
| Norm Nixon (11)
| The Forum17,505
| 1–2
|- align="center" bgcolor="#ffcccc"
| 4
| April 22
| Seattle
| L 115–117
| Kareem Abdul-Jabbar (31)
| Kareem Abdul-Jabbar (13)
| Norm Nixon (19)
| The Forum17,505
| 1–3
|- align="center" bgcolor="#ffcccc"
| 5
| April 25
| @ Seattle
| L 100–106
| Kareem Abdul-Jabbar (25)
| Kareem Abdul-Jabbar (14)
| Abdul-Jabbar, Nixon (8)
| Seattle Center Coliseum14,098
| 1–4
|-

Awards and records
 Kareem Abdul-Jabbar, All-NBA Second Team
 Kareem Abdul-Jabbar, NBA All-Defensive First Team
 Kareem Abdul-Jabbar, NBA All-Star Game

References

External links
 1978–79 Los Angeles Lakers Roster and Stats at basketball-reference.com

Los Angeles Lakers seasons
Los Angeles
Los Angle
Los Angle